Crane World is a 1999 Argentine  film, written and directed by Pablo Trapero. The film was produced by Lita Stantic and Pablo Trapero. It features Luis Margani, Adriana Aizemberg, Daniel Valenzuela, among others.

The movie was partly funded by Argentina's INCAA as well as by the Dutch Hubert Bals Fund.

The picture is about working class life in Argentina that's gritty (filmed in sepia, black and white).  The film follows the fortunes in the life of Rulo, an unemployed suburban man, who tries to earn a living as a crane operator in Buenos Aires.

In a survey of the 100 greatest films of Argentine cinema carried out by the Museo del Cine Pablo Ducrós Hicken in 2000, the film reached the 9th position. In a new version of the survey organized in 2022 by the specialized magazines La vida útil, Taipei and La tierra quema, presented at the Mar del Plata International Film Festival, the film reached the 39th position.

Plot
The film tells of Rulo (Luis Margani), a moderately successful musician in the 1970s.

Today he's divorced and an unemployed forty-something day-laborer living in Buenos Aires in the late 1990s.  He's anxious for whatever work he can find. He lives with his son who's also musically inclined, and his mother (Graciana Chironi).

His best friend Torres (Daniel Valenzuela), who has connections in the Argentine construction industry, finds him work as a large crane operator.

Rulo is dating Adriana (Adriana Aizemberg), who runs a sandwich shop.

He lands a job as an excavating machine operator in distant Patagonia. The workers live in a remote farmhouse and the relationship between management and labor is difficult.

One day the workers are not fed during lunch so they refuse to work until they eat. Rulo soon discovers that making a fresh start at a late age proves to be harder than he first thought.

Cast
 Luis Margani as Rulo
 Adriana Aizemberg as Adriana
 Daniel Valenzuela as Torres
 Roly Serrano as Walter
 Graciana Chironi as Rulo's mother
 Federico Esquerro as Claudio
 Alejandro Zucco as Zucco
 Alfonso Rementería as Sartori

Background

Casting
Pablo Trapero, in neo-realist fashion, used extras and bit players when he filmed.

Distribution
The film opened in Argentina on June 17, 1999.  Later it was presented at the Toronto International Film Festival on September 17, 1999.

The picture was screened at various film festivals, including: the Sundance Film Festival, Colorado, United States; the International Film Festival Rotterdam, Netherlands; the Fribourg Film Festival, Switzerland; the Buenos Aires International Festival of Independent Cinema, Argentina; the New Directors/New Films Festival, New York City; and others.

Critical reception
Film critic Stephen Holden, film critic for The New York Times, liked the look and tone of the film and wrote, "[the picture] is a stylistic throwback to 1940s Italian neo-realism. The movie's grainy, sepia-toned cinematography and low-key naturalistic performances by a cast of nonprofessionals enhance its slice-of-life authenticity."

Film critic Diego Lerer, a member of FIPRESCI, wrote an extensive essay about director Pablo Trapero's cinema films.  He reviewed Mundo grúa favorably and believes Trapero's film is advancing the "New Argentina Cinema Wave" and his films continues to break away from the older Argentine storytelling.  He wrote, "Trapero's film dared to break even freer from the classic narrative models. Even though the film has a story, and one that advances with utter efficiency, Crane World respects the characters' internal rhythm like none of the other films by young Argentines had done so far...In Trapero's film, the scenes are developed in all their length."

Awards

Wins
 Venice Film Festival: 'Cult Network Italia' Prize; Anicaflash Prize; both for Pablo Trapero; 1999.
 Havana Film Festival: Special Jury Prize; Pablo Trapero; 1999.
 Buenos Aires International Festival of Independent Cinema: Best Actor, Luis Margani; Best Director and OCIC Special Award, Pablo Trapero; 1999.
 Fribourg International Film Festival: Don Quixote Award; Ecumenical Jury Award; FIPRESCI Prize, For a first feature film offering a direct and truthful look at a personal strive for a decent life and solidarity; SAA Script Award; all for Pablo Trapero; 2000.
 Argentine Film Critics Association Awards: Silver Condor; Best First Film, Pablo Trapero; Best New Actor, Luis Margani; Best Supporting Actress, Adriana Aizemberg; 2000.
 Rotterdam International Film Festival: FIPRESCI Prize Tiger Competition, Pablo Trapero, For the sober and coherent realism with which it portrays the main character's humanity; Tiger Award, Pablo Trapero; 2000.
 Toulouse Latin America Film Festival: Grand Prix, Pablo Trapero; 2000.

Nominations
 Valladolid International Film Festival: Golden Spike, Pablo Trapero; 1999.
 Buenos Aires International Festival of Independent Cinema: Best Film, Pablo Trapero; 1999.
 Argentine Film Critics Association Awards: Silver Condor, Best Director, Pablo Trapero; Best Film; Best Original Screenplay, Pablo Trapero; 2000.
 Goya Awards: Goya, Best Spanish Language Foreign Film, Pablo Trapero, Argentina; 2000.

References

External links
 
 Crane World at the cinenacional.com 
 Crane World review at Cineismo by Guillermo Ravaschino 
 Crane World review at La Butaca by Ismael Alonso 
 

1999 films
1999 comedy-drama films
Argentine black-and-white films
Films directed by Pablo Trapero
Argentine independent films
Social realism in film
1990s Spanish-language films
Films shot in Buenos Aires
Argentine comedy-drama films
1999 independent films